This is a list of all songs performed by the English rock band Free.

Songs recorded by Free

 
Free